The Agnes River is a perennial river of the West Gippsland catchment, located in the South Gippsland region of the Australian state of Victoria.

Course and features
The river descends  over its course.

The Agnes River sub-catchment area is managed by the West Gippsland Catchment Management Authority.

Etymology
In the Aboriginal Brataualung language the name of the river is Kut-wut, with no defined meaning.

The river derives its current name from the Ages River, after Agnes, daughter of John Gellion, an early settler, and was named by Governor La Trobe in 1845 in honour of his daughter, Agnes.

See also

 List of rivers of Australia

References

External links
  website

West Gippsland catchment
Rivers of Gippsland (region)